Gowdal or Gudal may refer to:
 Gowdal, Sistan and Baluchestan
 Gowdal, West Azerbaijan